{{DISPLAYTITLE:C6H10O5}}
The molecular formula C6H10O5, of molecular weight 162.14, may refer to:

 3-Deoxyglucosone
 Diethyl pyrocarbonate
 Meglutol
 Levoglucosan
 Streptose

It is also the formula for the repeating unit of polymers of glucose:
 Starch
 Cellulose
 Glycogen
 the other glucans